Events in the year 1820 in Portugal.

Incumbents
Monarch: John VI

Events
 22 January – Battle of Tacuarembó
 Liberal Revolution
 24 August – Military revolt in Porto
 Establishment of a provisional junta of the Supreme Government of the Kingdom, in Porto
 15 September – Military revolt in Lisbon
 Establishment of an interim government, in Lisbon
 28 September – Establishment of a unified provisional junta
 22 November – Instruções, first election law
 December – Cortes election

References

 
Portugal
Portugal
Years of the 19th century in Portugal